Bird Island is a comedy radio series which stars Reece Shearsmith and was written by Katy Wix. The show was broadcast on BBC Radio 4 and ran for two series.

Plot
Ben Jones (Shearsmith), a 34-year-old ornithologist working in the sub-Antarctic on the fictional Bird Island. Working at a research station alongside boss Graham (Julian Rhind-Tutt), he tries to adapt to the cold solitude by keeping an audio diary of events at the research station as interactions with Graham are often awkward due to Ben's nerdy humour.

Cast
 Reece Shearsmith as Ben Jones
 Julian Rhind-Tutt as Graham
 Katy Wix as Jane
 Alison Steadman as Ben's mother

Episodes

Series one

Series two

Broadcast history
The first series, which ran for four episodes, was aired on 13 June 2012. A second series of four episodes was commissioned and aired from 4 May 2014.

Repeat airings have been made on BBC Radio 4 Extra.

References

BBC Radio comedy programmes
BBC Radio 4 programmes
2012 radio programme debuts